Elections to High Peak Borough Council in Derbyshire, England were held on 7 May 2015, at the same time as the 2015 UK General Election. All of the council falls up for election every four years and the control of the council changed from no overall control to Conservative councillor control.

Election result
After the election, the composition of the council was:
Conservative 23
Labour 17
Liberal Democrat 2
Independent 1

Ward by ward

Ward results

References

2015
2015 English local elections
May 2015 events in the United Kingdom
2010s in Derbyshire